Trichopelma is a genus of South American and Caribbean tarantulas first described by Eugène Simon in 1888.

Taxonomy
This genus was erected by Eugène Simon in 1888 with Trichopelma illetabile and the type species Trichopelma nitidum. A major review of mygalomorph spiders by Robert J. Raven in 1985 led to the genus being greatly enlarged, merging it with other genera Hapalopinus, Leptofischelia, Merothele, Obaerarius and Stothis. Raven placed this expanded genus in the family Barychelidae. In 1994, he proposed moving Trichopelma to the related family Theraphosidae, but without any new evidence, the move was not generally accepted. In 2014 José P. L. Guadanucci carried out a morphological phylogenetic analysis of some mygalomorph genera, including Trichopelma. The study supported Raven's hypothesis, and the genus was moved to Theraphosidae as a member of a re-limited subfamily Ischnocolinae sensu stricto.

Species
 it contains 22 species:
 Trichopelma affine (Simon, 1892) - St. Vincent
 Trichopelma banksia Özdikmen & Demir, 2012 - Cuba
 Trichopelma bimini Mori & Bertani, 2020 - Bahamas
 Trichopelma coenobita (Simon, 1889) - Venezuela
 Trichopelma cubanum (Simon, 1903) - Cuba
 Trichopelma fulvum (Bryant, 1948) - Haiti
 Trichopelma gabrieli Mori & Bertani, 2020 - Dominican Republic
 Trichopelma goloboffi Mori & Bertani, 2020 - Cuba
 Trichopelma huffi Mori & Bertani, 2020 - Dominican Republic
 Trichopelma illetabile Simon, 1888 - Brazil
 Trichopelma insulanum (Petrunkevitch, 1926) - St. Thomas
 Trichopelma juventud Mori & Bertani, 2020 - Cuba
 Trichopelma laselva Valerio, 1986 - Costa Rica
 Trichopelma laurae Mori & Bertani, 2020 - Cuba
 Trichopelma loui Mori & Bertani, 2020 - Jamaica 
 Trichopelma maculatum (Banks, 1906) - Bahama Is.
 Trichopelma nitidum Simon, 1888 (type) - Hispaniola
 Trichopelma platnicki Mori & Bertani, 2020 - Jamaica 
 Trichopelma steini (Simon, 1889) - Venezuela
 Trichopelma tostoi Mori & Bertani, 2020 - Dominican Republic
 Trichopelma venadense (Valerio, 1986) - Costa Rica
 Trichopelma zebra (Petrunkevitch, 1925) - Panama

References

Theraphosidae
Theraphosidae genera
Spiders of Central America
Spiders of South America
Taxa named by Eugène Simon